Battagram is a city and Union Council of Battagram District in Khyber Pakhtunkhwa Province of Pakistan. It is located at 34°41'N 73°1'E and has an altitude of 1038 metres (3408 feet).

Climate
With a mild and generally warm and temperate climate, Battagram features a humid subtropical climate (Cfa) under the Köppen climate classification.

Education 

The schools are being built with the help of several NGOs and foreign funds to improve the literacy rate of the people.

2005 earthquake

Battagram was among the areas affected by the earthquake of 8 October 2005, where more than 4,500 people were killed and approximately 35,000 were injured.

Administration
Battagram District is divided into two tehsils, the proper Battagram and Allai (which are Banna, Bateela, Batkul, Biari, Jambera, Pashto, Rashang and Sakargah). Proper Battagram main city is a tehsil and district headquarters and is also one of 20 Union Councils of the District of Battagram.

The Battagram Tehsil is subdivided into 12 Union Councils:

See also 
 Battagram District
 Battagram Tehsil

References

 Union councils of Battagram District
Cities in Khyber Pakhtunkhwa